The Gay Diplomat is a 1931 American film. Directed by Richard Boleslawski for RKO Radio Pictures, it starred Ivan Lebedeff, Genevieve Tobin and Betty Compson.

Synopsis
Captain Orloff (Ivan Lebedeff) is a Russian military officer who is sent to Bucharest to discover and dispose of a female spy. The three suspected spies are Countess Diana Dorchy (Genevieve Tobin), Baroness Alma Corri (Betty Compson) and Madame Blinis (Ilka Chase). Before learning the identity of the spy, Orloff falls in love with Diana. In the course of events, the spy is revealed to be Alma who is ultimately tricked into confessing. Orloff returns with his prisoner to St. Petersburg and is joined on the train by Diana.

Cast
 Genevieve Tobin as Countess Diana Dorchy
 Betty Compson as Baroness Alma Corri
 Ivan Lebedeff as Captain Ivan Orloff
 Ilka Chase as Madame Blinis
 Purnell Pratt as Colonel George Gorin
 Colin Campbell as Gamble
 Arthur Edmund Carew as The Suave Man
 Edward Martindel as Ambassador
 John St. Polis as General
 Judith Vosselli as Wife
 George Irving as A colonel
 Rita LaRoy as Natalie

Production
According to the trade journal Film Daily, RKO reported the original story "Strange Women" was written by Lebedeff and Benn W. Levy. In addition to Strange Women, working titles included Woman Pursued and Kisses By Command.

Shooting took place in June 1931. Henry Hobart, the original production supervisor of Gay Diplomat, was so upset by the film's inadequacies and by Lebedeff's lack of star quality that he walked off the project. Pandro Berman replaced Hobart as supervising producer in mid-production, thus earning Berman his first screen credit.

The picture was Lebedeff's first starring role and he figured heavily in RKO's marketing campaign, which touted him as another Valentino and portrayed the story as based on events from his life. Tobin was borrowed from Universal to play the female lead.

Reception
The film was released September 19, 1931. According to RKO records, the film was the studio's lowest grossing film of the 1930–31 season and lost $115,000 at the box office.

The Gay Diplomat was generally poorly received by critics. New York Times critic Mordaunt Hall called it "highly predictable". The Variety reviewer found the story incomprehensible and called the dialog "inane" and the acting "some of the poorest"; Film Daily, summed it up as "mechanical and slow moving ... with artificial treatment and acting".

References

External links
 
 
 
 

1931 films
American black-and-white films
RKO Pictures films
World War I spy films
1931 drama films
American drama films
Films directed by Ryszard Bolesławski
Films set in Bucharest
1930s English-language films
1930s American films